Synaphobranchus oregoni is an eel in the family Synaphobranchidae (cutthroat eels). It was described by Peter Henry John Castle in 1960. It is a marine, deep water-dwelling eel which is known from the western central Atlantic Ocean, including the Bahamas, Trinidad and Tobago, Mexico, and the United States.

Although little is known about the species' ecology, due to its deep water nature and its lack of known use in commercial trade, the IUCN redlist currently lists Synaphobranchus oregoni as Least Concern.

References

Synaphobranchidae
Fish described in 1960